Wanging'ombe (Wangi Ngombe) is a town and ward in Wanging'ombe District in the Njombe Region of the Tanzanian Southern Highlands. , the population of the ward was 18,545.

History
In 2012 it was incorporated in the new eponymous district of the new Njombe Region. Prior to that it was part of the old Njombe District in the Iringa Region.

References

Wards of Njombe Region